Zoran Kulić (Serbian Cyrillic: Зоран Кулић; born 19 August 1975) is a former Serbian professional footballer.

Statistics

External links
 FFU profile

1975 births
Living people
Serbian footballers
Association football midfielders
FK Hajduk Kula players
OFK Bečej 1918 players
FK Sileks players
FK Mladost Lučani players
FK Smederevo players
FK Budućnost Banatski Dvor players
Serbia and Montenegro expatriate footballers
Serbia and Montenegro footballers
Expatriate footballers in North Macedonia
Expatriate footballers in Ukraine
Serbia and Montenegro expatriate sportspeople in Ukraine